Kurisu (栗須, 栗栖) is a Japanese surname. Notable people with the surname include:

Chian Kurisu director
Hawaii Winter Baseball League owner Duane Kurisu
Hoichi Kurisu gardener
Masanobu Kurisu wrestler
Takeo Kurisu 1947-1948 Minister of Finance (Japan)
Tatsuya Kurisu mixed martial artist
Yukina Kurisu actress, voice actress
Yumiko Kurisu classical soloist
Kurisu Aoki adult model

See also
Nishi-Kurisu Station 西栗栖駅 (にしくりす)
Kurisu, Emmaste Parish, a rural village in northwestern Estonia.
Steins;Gate, a video game with a character of the same name. 

Japanese-language surnames